"Love Sneakin' Up On You" is a song by American blues singer Bonnie Raitt. Released in March 1994 from her 12th album, Longing in Their Hearts (1994), the song topped Canada's RPM 100 Hit Tracks chart for three weeks and reached number 19 on the US Billboard Hot 100. The song also charted in Germany and the United Kingdom. In 1995, it was nominated for both the Grammy Award for Record of the Year and the Grammy Award for Best Female Rock Vocal Performance. Meiert Avis directed the song's music video.

Critical reception
Fell and Rufer from the Gavin Report wrote, "Bonnie gets up and down with this funky preface to her next album, Longing In Their Hearts. How great it is to have a beat-driven fresh track from one of our format's icons."

Track listings
 US 7-inch and cassette single
A. "Love Sneakin' Up On You" – 3:39
B. "Hell to Pay" – 4:02

 European CD single
 "Love Sneakin' Up On You" – 3:39
 "Nick of Time" – 3:52
 "Baby Mine" – 3:14
 "Hell to Pay" – 4:02

Charts

Weekly charts

Year-end charts

Release history

References

1994 singles
1994 songs
Bonnie Raitt songs
Capitol Records singles
EMI Records singles
Music videos directed by Meiert Avis
RPM Top Singles number-one singles
Song recordings produced by Don Was
Songs written by Tom Snow